In the Style of Jazz is a 2010 romantic comedy directed by Stanislav Govorukhin.

Plot
The protagonist is a successful young man with charm and the ability to please all women regardless of their age and position in society. The heroine is a girl of twenty-six, with a head gone to work, disappointed in love and no longer dreaming of a woman's happiness. But ... he gets acquainted with her younger sister and mother, still a beauty. Over time, they find themselves in the power of the hero's charm.

Cast
Michał Żebrowski as  Sergei Vladimirovich Saveliev, writer (voiced by Viktor Rakov)
Olga Krasko as  Irina, the eldest daughter, an actress
Elena Yakovleva as  Vera Dmitrievna, mother, stewardess
Aglaya Shilovskaya as  Zhenya, the youngest daughter, a student
Anatoly Bely as  actor
Tatyana Ustinova as Tanya, Sergey's ex-wife, a successful writer (actually - cameo)
Marat Basharov as  actor
Fyodor Dobronravov as  Lieutenant Colonel
Roman Kartsev  asOdessa taxi driver
Anna Samokhina as wife of   Victor Ivanovich
Viktor Sukhorukov as Viktor Ivanovich, director
Irina Skobtseva as former mother-in-law of Sergey Saveliev
Olesya Zhurakovskaya as waitress in an Odessa restaurant

Awards
2010 —   Golden Rook Рrize for the first place in the contest  Vyborg Аaccount  of the XVIII annual Russian film festival "Window to Europe".
2011 — Grand Prix (Audience Choice Award) of the XIX All-Russian Film Festival  Vivat, Cinema of Russia!  In St. Petersburg

References

External links

Russian romantic comedy films
2010 romantic comedy films
2010 films
Films directed by Stanislav Govorukhin
Mosfilm films
2010s Russian-language films